William DePuy House is a historic home located at Lima in Livingston County, New York. It was built about 1851 and is a -story frame dwelling with vernacular Greek Revival and Gothic Revival design elements.  The front features a 1-story hip-roofed porch supported by Doric columns.

It was listed on the National Register of Historic Places in 1989.

References

Houses on the National Register of Historic Places in New York (state)
Greek Revival houses in New York (state)
Houses completed in 1851
Houses in Livingston County, New York
1851 establishments in New York (state)
National Register of Historic Places in Livingston County, New York